Shatrughan Prasad Sinha (born 9 December 1945) is an Indian actor and politician. He is a Member of Parliament, Lok Sabha from Asansol constituency as a member of All India Trinamool Congress (TMC). Earlier he was elected as Member of Parliament, Lok Sabha (2009–2014, 2014–2019) from Patna Sahib. He was also a Member of Parliament, Rajya Sabha during 1996–2002 and 2002–2008. He was a Union Cabinet Minister of Health and Family Welfare and Shipping in the Atal Bihari Vajpayee government. He was a member of standing committee on transport, tourism and culture and member of consultative committee in ministry of external affairs and overseas Indian affairs from 2014 to 2019.
In 2016, his biography, Anything but Khamosh, was released.

Early life
Sinha was born in Patna, Bihar, to Bhubaneswari Prasad Sinha and Shyama Devi Sinha on 9 December 1945. He is the youngest of four brothers – Ram, Lakshman, Bharat and himself. He graduated from Patna Science College with a Bachelor of Science. He had a Diploma in Acting from the Film and Television Institute of India Pune. Currently there's a scholarship being awarded in his name in the institute to Diploma students. He moved to Mumbai, where he started his career in the film industry. He is married to former Miss India Poonam Sinha (née Chandiramani).

Acting career
Sinha got his first acting opportunity to play a Pakistani military officer in Dev Anand's Prem Pujari. Subsequently, he got a small role as a police inspector in Mohan Sehgal's Sajan in 1969. The release of Prem Pujari was delayed, so his first released film was Sajan. He later appeared in villainous roles in Pyar Hi Pyar, Banphool, Manmohan Desai's Raampur Ka Lakshman, Bhai Ho Toh Aisa, Sultan Ahmed's Heera, and in Vijay Anand's Blackmail.

He played supporting roles in many films before appearing in Gulzar's Mere Apne in 1971. He was cast along with his future wife Poonam Sinha, then called as Komal, in the movie Sabak (1973). He played supporting roles in Khilona, Dulal Guha's Dost in 1974, Aa Gale Lag Jaa, Jheel Ke Us Paar and Gambler in 1970. He acted with Amitabh Bachchan in films like Raaste Ka Paththar, Yaar Meri Zindagi, Shaan and Kala Paththar, of which Shaan was the biggest success. He later acted in Bombay to Goa, Dostana and Naseeb. His films as the lead hero between 1970 and 1975 were not hits. His first successful film as lead hero was in Kalicharan in 1976. Subhash Ghai went with the story of Kalicharan to N. N. Sippy and said he wanted to direct his first film. N. N. Sippy got ready to produce after few days, but wanted to cast only Rajesh Khanna in the lead role of Kalicharan. Then only when N. N. Sippy confirmed with Rajesh Khanna that Khanna did not have dates for the years 1976 and 1977, Sippy asked Subhash Ghai to go ahead with the script and direct Kalicharan with Sinha in the lead.

Sinha played the lead hero were Ab Kya Hoga, Khan Dost, Yaaraon Ka Yaar, Dillagi, Vishwanath, Muqabla and Jaani Dushman. He then became a bankable action hero from early eighties to mid-nineties. He co-starred with Sanjeev Kumar in Bereham, Hathkadi, Baad Aur Badnaam, Chehre Pe Chehra, Hirasat and Qatl. He starred in Hrishikesh Mukherjee's Naram Garam, Brij's Bombay 405 Miles and Taqdeer. He has sung the song "Ek Baat Suni Hai Chachaji" with singer Sushma Shrestha in the film Naram Garam in 1981, composed by R. D. Burman. However, when his films as lead hero like Prakash Mehra's Jawalamukhi, Amjad Khan's Chor Police, Ameer Aadmi Garib Aadmi and Raj Khosla's Mera Dost Meraa Dushman became flops, despite being appreciated by critics, there was threat to his career as lead hero. He also produced and acted in the film Kalka, based on life of coal mine workers, released in 1983.

He then bounced back by bagging roles in films with lead hero as Rajesh Khanna in films like Dil E Nadan, Aaj Ka M.L.A Ram Avtaar, Maqsad and Paapi Pet Ka Sawal Hai. His other hit films in the mid-eighties included Jeene Nahi Doonga, Bhawani Junction, Aandhi-Toofan, Ramkali, Ilzaam and Asli Naqli. He then went on to star with Jeetendra in Hoshiyar, Khudgarz, Ranbhoomi and Mulzim. He co-starred with Dharmendra in Insaniyat Ke Dushman, Loha (1987), Aag Hi Aag (1987), Hawalaat and Zalzala. He was in films like Telephone (1985), Sherni (1988), Khoon Bhari Maang (1988) and Adharm (1992). He starred with Raajkumar in Betaaj Badshah in 1994 and Salman Khan in Chaand Kaa Tukdaa in 1994. Sinha credited Rajesh Khanna for getting Kaalicharan and for the revival of his career as lead hero in the 1980s, however their friendship got affected when Shatrughan Sinha stood as the BJP candidate against Rajesh Khanna in the 1992 election. Though as a Congress candidate Khanna had defeated Sinha by 25000 margin of votes, Khanna was disappointed at Sinha for standing against him in the elections.

Sinha was selected by Rediff as one of the most unconventional actors in Hindi cinema (the others being Ajay Devgan, Amitabh Bachchan, Irrfan Khan, Rajesh Khanna, Rajinikanth, Shahrukh Khan and Sunil Shetty). In 2008, he became a judge on The Great Indian Laughter Challenge show, season 4 on STAR One TV. On 3 October 2009, Sinha appeared on Sony Entertainment Television Asia's show Dus Ka Dum season 2 as host for a special episode. He is currently hosting the Bhojpuri version of the popular game show Kaun Banega Crorepati on Mahuaa channel.

He portrayed Chief Minister N.T. Rama Rao in Ram Gopal Varma's Rakta Charitra.

Political career
Sinha entered politics by contesting in a by-election opposite Rajesh Khanna. He quoted in an interview that his biggest regret in his life was contesting election against his friend Khanna. Khanna won the elections by beating Sinha by 25,000 votes; however, he was hurt and never spoke to Sinha thereafter. Sinha did try to rebuild his friendship with Khanna; however, that never happened until Khanna's death in 2012.

He won the Patna Sahib Lok Sabha constituency in Bihar during the 2009 Indian general elections. He defeated another cinema celebrity, Shekhar Suman. Out of a total of 552,293 votes polled, Sinha received 316,549 votes. He won the seat in the subsequent 2014 Indian general elections, as well. In 2014, he received 485,905 from the 813,411 total votes polled.

Sinha became a cabinet minister in the Third Vajpayee ministry from the 13th Lok Sabha, holding two portfolios, the Ministry of Health and Family Welfare (January 2003 – May 2004), and the Department of Shipping (August 2004). As of May 2006, he was appointed as the head of the BJP Culture and Arts Department.

On 6 April 2019, Sinha became a member of the Indian National Congress in presence of Congress general secretary K. C. Venugopal and Randeep Surjewala. Sinha became a member of the Indian National Congress Party, having joined them after he was not given a seat for the 2019 Indian general elections by the Bharatiya Janata Party.

In March 2022, Sinha joined All India Trinamool Congress to contest in the By-election for the Asansol Lok Sabha constituency. On 16 April 2022, Sinha won by defeating Bharatiya Janata Party's Agnimitra Paul by a margin of 303,209 votes.

Awards

Filmography

Playback singer:
 Dost (1974) (playback singer; uncredited)
 Jwalamukhi (1980) (playback singer)
 Naram Garam (1981) (playback singer)

See also
List of politicians from Bihar

References

|-

|-

|-

|-

External links

 
 Official Biographical Sketch in Lok Sabha website
 

1946 births
Living people
Politicians from Patna
Indian National Congress politicians from Bihar
Rajya Sabha members from Bihar
Film and Television Institute of India alumni
Indian male film actors
Male actors in Hindi cinema
Indian actor-politicians
India MPs 2009–2014
Male actors from Mumbai
Lok Sabha members from Bihar
India MPs 2014–2019
20th-century Indian male actors
21st-century Indian male actors
Male actors from Patna
Trinamool Congress politicians from West Bengal
India MPs 2019–present
Lok Sabha members from West Bengal
Filmfare Lifetime Achievement Award winners